Mark Slater may refer to:
Mark Slater (fund manager) (born 1969), British fund manager and co-founder of Slater Investments
Mark Slater (American football) (born 1955), American football player for Philadelphia and San Diego
Mark Slater (Australian footballer) (born 1951), Australian rules footballer for Collingwood